Monsieur de Pourceaugnac is a 1985 French drama film directed by Michel Mitrani that is based on the 1669 play of the same name by Molière. It was screened in the Un Certain Regard section at the 1985 Cannes Film Festival.

Cast
 Michel Galabru - Monsieur de Pourceaugnac
 Roger Coggio - Sbrigani
 Fanny Cottençon - Julie
 Jérôme Anger - Eraste
 Jean-Paul Roussillon - Oronte
 Rosy Varte - Nérine
 Anne-Marie Besse - Lucette
 Jean-Pierre Castaldi - The Swiss
 Michel Aumont - Le premier médecin
 Paul Le Person - Le second médecin
 Michel Mitrani - Louis XIV
 Jean-Louis Bindi - Un chanteur
 Étienne Lestringant - Un chanteur
 Paule Andrée Nirouet - Une chanteuse
 Jean-Paul Barbier - Un danseur

References

External links

1985 films
1980s French-language films
1985 drama films
Films directed by Michel Mitrani
French drama films
1980s French films